A Twenty20 International (T20I) is an international cricket match between two representative teams, each having T20I status, as determined by the International Cricket Council (ICC), and is played under the rules of Twenty20 cricket. The first T20I was played between Australia and New Zealand on 17 February 2005. Bermuda played their first T20I under the captaincy of Irving Romaine at the Civil Service Cricket Club, Stormont, Belfast, on 3 August 2008, against Scotland. This match took place during the 2009 ICC World Twenty20 Qualifier, which took place between 2–5 August 2008. Bermuda played a total of three matches during this tournament and lost them all, failing to qualify for the 2009 ICC World Twenty20. Bermuda later lost their T20I status after the 2009 World Cup Qualifier, in which they finished ninth. In April 2018, the ICC decided to grant full Twenty20 International (T20I) status to all its members. Therefore, all Twenty20 matches played between Bermuda and other ICC members after 1 January 2019 will have T20I status.

The list is initially arranged in the order in which each player won his first Twenty20 cap. Where more than one player won his first Twenty20 cap in the same match, those players are listed alphabetically by surname.

Key

Players
Statistics are correct as of 4 March 2023.

See also
Twenty20 International
Bermuda national cricket team
List of Bermuda ODI cricketers

References

Bermuda Twenty20
Twenty20